The Thornhill Thunderbirds were a Canadian Junior "B" ice hockey team from Thornhill, Ontario. They played in the Central Junior B Hockey League.

History
The Thornhill Thunderbirds were a junior hockey team in Ontario. The team existed in two phases. The first was a Junior B team that started in the Mid-Ontario Junior B league.  After the league folded in 1978, the team moved to the Central Junior B league, where it folded after the 1984 season.

A second Thornhill Thunderbirds team is now known as the Mississauga Chargers. Hockey returned to Thornhill in 1988, when the Metro Junior B Richmond Hill Dukes moved to Thornhill again assuming the Thunderbirds nickname. In 1990 that team merged with the Markham Connection (which had been known as the Markham Travelways from 1983 until 1989), and for one year were named the Markham Thunderbirds. In 1991 they returned to their Thornhill Thunderbirds name for one season. In 1992, they moved to Mississauga.

Thornhill Thunderbirds Junior "B"

References 

Defunct ice hockey teams in Canada
Ice hockey teams in Ontario